Marvin Morgan Jr. (born 16 August 1992 in Kingston) is a Jamaican football midfielder who plays with Scarborough SC. in the Canadian Soccer League.

Club career

Santos FC (Jamaica) 
Morgan Jr. played for Santos FC in Jamaica while still a schoolboy, scoring 8 goals in the 2008/2009 season.

Boys Town FC (Jamaica) (loan) 
Having experienced success at the schoolboy level with St George's College, Marvin Morgan Jr. signed with Boys' Town F.C. in February 2010. Morgan Jr. enjoyed success in his first season in the DPL leading his team to a top 6 finish and capturing the 2010 Champions Cup.  For 2010/2011 season, Morgan Jr. has been influential in the central midfield for Boys' Town, although he missed several weeks away on trials with various clubs in Denmark. Morgan returned to Boys' Town in January 2012 for the remainder of the Red Stripe Premiere League season. He led his team to another second-place finish in the Red Stripe Premiere League and qualification to the 2013 CFU Club Championship.

Ventura County Fusion (USA) 

Morgan was fielded by Boys' Town in their first two matches of the 2011/2012 season, but was deemed ineligible since he was not given clearance by the USSF after playing in the United States for Ventura County Fusion.

Waterhouse F.C. (Jamaica) 

In 2013, Morgan Jr. moved to Waterhouse F.C.

Arnett Gardens F.C. (Jamaica) 

In 2014, Marvin moved to Arnett Gardens F.C. and also won the RSPL in 2017.

Scarborough SC 
In 2019, he played in the Canadian Soccer League with Scarborough SC. In his debut season he assisted in securing the CSL Championship after defeating FC Ukraine United. The following season he assisted in securing the First Division title, and featured in the championship final against FC Vorkuta, but were defeated by a score of 2–1. He re-signed with Scarborough for the 2021 season. He featured in the ProSound Cup final against FC Vorkuta, but were defeated in a penalty shootout. Morgan assisted in securing his second championship title by defeating Vorkuta in the 2021 playoffs.

International career 
In 2008, Morgan featured in the 2008 CFU U16 championship for Jamaica. He then made his senior international debut against Trinidad and Tobago on 10 October 2010. Morgan Jr. was also named to the 2010 Digicel Caribbean Championship squad for Jamaica. He scored two goals versus Guyana on 1 December 2010.

International goals
Scores and results list Jamaica's goal tally first.

Personal life 
Marvin Mr. Man Morgan, Jr. comes from a footballing family as his grandfather, Lloyd "Respic" Morgan, father, Marvin Morgan Sr. and twin sister, Marvel Morgan also play the sport.  Morgan Jr. was introduced to the sport by his father Marvin Morgan Sr., who played alongside his son in 2010 at Boys' Town F.C.

Honours
Scarborough SC
CSL Championship: 2019, 2021
Canadian Soccer League First Division: 2020

References

External links
 

1992 births
Living people
Sportspeople from Kingston, Jamaica
Jamaican footballers
Expatriate soccer players in the United States
Boys' Town F.C. players
Santos F.C. (Jamaica) players
Jamaican expatriate footballers
Association football midfielders
Waterhouse F.C. players
Ventura County Fusion players
Arnett Gardens F.C. players
Scarborough SC players
National Premier League players
USL League Two players
Canadian Soccer League (1998–present) players
Jamaica international footballers